The 2004 Food City 500 was the sixth stock car race of the 2004 NASCAR Nextel Cup Series season and the 44th iteration of the event. The race was held on Sunday, March 28, 2004, before a crowd of 160,000 in Bristol, Tennessee at Bristol Motor Speedway, a 0.533 miles (0.858 km) permanent oval-shaped racetrack. The race took the scheduled 500 laps to complete. Kurt Busch of Roush Racing would hold off the field on the final restart with two to go to win his fifth career NASCAR Nextel Cup Series win of his career and his first of the season. To fill out the podium, Rusty Wallace of Penske-Jasper Racing and Kevin Harvick of Richard Childress Racing would finish second and third, respectively.

Background 

The Bristol Motor Speedway, formerly known as Bristol International Raceway and Bristol Raceway, is a NASCAR short track venue located in Bristol, Tennessee. Constructed in 1960, it held its first NASCAR race on July 30, 1961. Despite its short length, Bristol is among the most popular tracks on the NASCAR schedule because of its distinct features, which include extraordinarily steep banking, an all concrete surface, two pit roads, and stadium-like seating. It has also been named one of the loudest NASCAR tracks.

Entry list

Practice

First practice 
The first practice session occurred on Friday, March 26, at 11:20 AM EST and would last for two hours.

Second practice 
The second practice session occurred on Saturday, March 27, at 9:30 AM EST and would last for 45 minutes.

Third and final practice 
The third and final practice session, sometimes referred to as Happy Hour, occurred on Saturday, March 27, at 11:10 AM EST and would last for 45 minutes.

Qualifying 
Qualifying occurred on Friday, March 27, at 3:00 PM EST. Each driver would have two laps to set a fastest time; the fastest of the two would count as their official qualifying lap. Positions 1-38 would be decided on time, while positions 39-43 would be based on provisionals. Four spots are awarded by the use of provisionals based on owner's points. The fifth is awarded to a past champion who has not otherwise qualified for the race. If no past champ needs the provisional, the next team in the owner points will be awarded a provisional.

Kirk Shelmerdine would crash on his second lap in turn 3, slamming the outside wall. While he had set a lap, he was forced to use a provisional.

Morgan Shepherd would be the only driver to not qualify for the race.

Full qualifying results

Race results

References 

2004 NASCAR Nextel Cup Series
NASCAR races at Bristol Motor Speedway
March 2004 sports events in the United States
2004 in sports in Tennessee